Bernard Rogers (4 February 1893 – 24 May 1968) was an American composer. His best known work is The Passion, an oratorio  written in 1942.

Life and career
 
Rogers was born in New York City.  He studied with Arthur Farwell, Ernest Bloch, Percy Goetschius, and Nadia Boulanger. He taught at the Cleveland Institute of Music, The Hartt School, and the Eastman School of Music. His pupils included Stephen Albert, Dominick Argento, Jacob Avshalomov, William Bergsma, David Borden, Will Gay Bottje, David Diamond, Walter Hartley, Ronald Lo Presti, Ulysses Kay, Louis Mennini, John La Montaine, W. Francis McBeth, Ron Nelson, Burrill Phillips, Gardner Read, H. Owen Reed, Robert Ward, John Weinzweig, Norma Wendelburg, Richard Lane and Clifton Williams among others.

He joined the Eastman faculty in 1929. He composed five operas, five symphonies, other works for orchestra, chamber music, three cantatas, choral music and Lieder. His one-act opera "The Warrior," for which Norman Corwin wrote the libretto, received its premiere at The Metropolitan Opera on January 11, 1947.

He was a National Patron of Delta Omicron, an international professional music fraternity.

Rogers retired from Eastman in 1967.  He died in Rochester on May 24, 1968, two days after a heart attack.(25 February 1993). Eastman Wind Ensemble remembers Bernard Rogers, The Greece Post (Greece, New York), p. 23

Notable students

References

Citations

Sources

External links
Bernard Rogers' page at Theodore Presser Company
Bernard Rogers Collection at Eastman School of Music

1893 births
1968 deaths
20th-century classical composers
American male classical composers
American classical composers
Cleveland Institute of Music faculty
University of Hartford Hartt School faculty
Jewish classical composers
Eastman School of Music faculty
Pupils of Percy Goetschius
Pupils of Ernest Bloch
Musicians from New York City
Jewish American classical composers
American opera composers
Male opera composers
20th-century American composers
Classical musicians from New York (state)
20th-century American male musicians
20th-century American Jews